Michael Novak (born 30 December 1990) is an Austrian professional footballer who plays for Wolfsberger AC.

References

1990 births
Living people
People from Sankt Veit an der Glan
Footballers from Carinthia (state)
Austrian footballers
Austrian Football Bundesliga players
2. Liga (Austria) players
FC St. Veit players
SV Mattersburg players
FK Austria Wien players
Wolfsberger AC players
Association football defenders
Austrian people of Slovenian descent